Vivienne Maria Rignall (born 10 January 1973) is a New Zealand former swimmer, who specialised in sprint freestyle events. Rignall represented New Zealand, as a 27-year-old, at the 2000 Summer Olympics, and eventually, at the 2002 Commonwealth Games, where she became a sixth-place finalist in the 50 m freestyle. She also holds a dual residency status to compete internationally for her parents' homeland.

Rignall competed only in the women's 50 m freestyle at the 2000 Summer Olympics in Sydney. She achieved a FINA A-standard of 25.85, a national record, from the German Championships in Berlin. Rignall shared a ninth seed with Sweden's Anna-Karin Kammerling in the semifinals at 25.61, but missed a spot for the top 8 final by 12-hundredths of a second. Earlier in the prelims, she posted fourth-seeded time and a New Zealand record of 25.52 from the final of ten heats, pulling herself off with a seventh-place finish.

At the 2002 Commonwealth Games in Manchester, England, Rignall failed to attain a medal for New Zealand in the 50 m freestyle, finishing sixth with a time of 26.02.

References

External links

Manchester 2002 Athlete's Profile

1973 births
Living people
New Zealand female swimmers
Olympic swimmers of New Zealand
Swimmers at the 2000 Summer Olympics
Swimmers at the 2002 Commonwealth Games
New Zealand female freestyle swimmers
People from Ludwigsburg
Sportspeople from Stuttgart (region)
New Zealand people of German descent
Commonwealth Games competitors for New Zealand
20th-century New Zealand women
21st-century New Zealand women